The 2003 IWCC Trophy was an international women's cricket tournament held in the Netherlands between 21 and 26 July 2003. Organised by the International Women's Cricket Council (IWCC), it was the inaugural edition of what is now the World Cup Qualifier.

The tournament featured six teams and was played using a round-robin format. The top two teams, Ireland and the West Indies, qualified for the 2005 World Cup in South Africa. All matches held One Day International (ODI) status, with Japan making its debut in that format and Scotland playing only its second ODI tournament. Ireland's Barbara McDonald was named the player of the tournament, while the leading runscorer and leading wicket taker, respectively, were Pauline te Beest of the Netherlands and Pakistan's 15-year-old off spinner, Sajjida Shah.

Background and qualification
At all prior editions of the World Cup, participation had been determined by invitation only. The creation of a qualifying tournament, to be known as the IWCC Trophy, was proposed at the 1997 meeting of the IWCC committee in Calcutta, India. It was initially suggested that the inaugural tournament be held in 2002 for the planned 2004 World Cup, but the dates for both the IWCC Trophy and the World Cup were both later shifted forward by one year. Six teams participated in the inaugural IWCC Trophy:

  (7th place at 2000 World Cup)
  (invitee)
  (8th place at 2000 World Cup)

  (invitee)
  (invitee)
  (invitee)

Ireland and the Netherlands qualified for the tournament based on their performance at the 2000 World Cup in New Zealand, where they were the bottom two teams. Of the other four teams, Pakistan and the West Indies had participated at the 1997 World Cup in India, while Scotland (one of the IWCC's newest members) had played in only one prior international tournament, the 2001 European Championship. Japan was making its international debut in women's cricket, with the sport having only popularised among women in the preceding decade.

Squads

Venues

Group stage

Statistics

Most runs
The top five tournament batsmen are included in this table, ordered by runs scored and then by batting average.

Source: CricketArchive

Most wickets

The top five tournament bowlers are listed in this table, listed by wickets taken and then by bowling average.

Source: CricketArchive

References

External links 
 International Women's Cricket Council Trophy 2003 at ESPNcricinfo

2003
International women's cricket competitions in the Netherlands
2003 in Dutch sport
International cricket competitions in 2003
2005 Women's Cricket World Cup
July 2003 sports events in Europe
2003 in women's cricket